Kawamura ( or ) is a Japanese surname. Notable people with the surname include:

 Aki Kawamura, gravure idol and television idol
 Hikaru Kawamura, gravure idol
 Sumiyoshi Kawamura, Admiral in the Imperial Japanese Navy
 Kageaki Kawamura, Field Marshal in the Imperial Japanese Army
 Kaori Kawamura, singer
 Kiyoo Kawamura, painter
, Japanese ice hockey player
 Masahiro Kawamura, Japanese Golfer
 Maria Kawamura, voice actress
 Megumi Kawamura, model and volleyball player
 Mika Kawamura, manga artist and author
, Japanese women's basketball player
, Japanese field hockey player
 Ryo Kawamura, announcer
 Ryuichi Kawamura, singer-songwriter, musician, actor, and record producer.
 Seiko Kawamura, volleyball player
 Takashi Kawamura, politician
 Takuo Kawamura, voice actor
 Takeo Kawamura, baseball player
 Takeo Kawamura, politician
 Takeshi Kawamura, playwright and director
, Japanese footballer
 Terry Teruo Kawamura, United States Army soldier 
 Yasuo Kawamura, speed skater
 Yuka Kawamura, singer-songwriter, composer
 Yukie Kawamura, gravure idol
 Zuiken Kawamura, merchant
 Kazuma Kawamura , singer, dancer, actor.

Fictional characters 
 Takashi Kawamura (The Prince of Tennis) (河村隆), a character in The Prince of Tennis

See also
 Kawamura Station (Aichi), a guided bus station in Moriyama-ku, Nagoya, Aichi Prefecture
 Kawamura Station (Kumamoto), a railway station in Sagara, Kumamoto, Kumamoto Prefecture
 10352 Kawamura, a main-belt asteroid

Japanese-language surnames